Sergei Petrovich Novikov (also Serguei) (Russian: Серге́й Петро́вич Но́виков) (born 20 March 1938) is a Soviet and Russian mathematician, noted for work in both algebraic topology and soliton theory. In 1970, he won the Fields Medal.

Early life
Novikov was born on 20 March 1938 in Gorky, Soviet Union (now Nizhny Novgorod, Russia).

He grew up in a family of talented mathematicians. His father was Pyotr Sergeyevich Novikov, who gave a negative solution to the word problem for groups. His mother, Lyudmila Vsevolodovna Keldysh, and maternal uncle, Mstislav Vsevolodovich Keldysh, were also important mathematicians.

In 1955 Novikov entered Moscow State University, from which he graduated in 1960. Four years later he received the Moscow Mathematical Society Award for young mathematicians. In the same year he defended a dissertation for the Candidate of Science in Physics and Mathematics degree (equivalent to the PhD) at Moscow State University. In 1965 he defended a dissertation for the Doctor of Science in Physics and Mathematics degree there. In 1966 he became a Corresponding member of the Academy of Sciences of the Soviet Union.

Research in topology
Novikov's early work was in cobordism theory, in relative isolation. Among other advances he showed how the Adams spectral sequence, a powerful tool for proceeding from homology theory to the calculation of homotopy groups, could be adapted to the new (at that time) cohomology theory typified by cobordism and K-theory. This required the development of the idea of cohomology operations in the general setting, since the basis of the spectral sequence is the initial data of Ext functors taken with respect to a ring of such operations, generalising the Steenrod algebra. The resulting Adams–Novikov spectral sequence is now a basic tool in stable homotopy theory.

Novikov also carried out important research in geometric topology, being one of the pioneers with William Browder, Dennis Sullivan, and C. T. C. Wall of the surgery theory method for classifying high-dimensional manifolds. He proved the topological invariance of the rational Pontryagin classes, and posed the Novikov conjecture. This work was recognised by the award in 1970 of the Fields Medal. He was not allowed to travel to Nice to accept his medal, but he received it in 1971 when the International Mathematical Union met in Moscow. From about 1971 he moved to work in the field of isospectral flows, with connections to the theory of theta functions. Novikov's conjecture about the Riemann–Schottky problem (characterizing principally polarized abelian varieties that are the Jacobian of some algebraic curve) stated, essentially, that this was the case if and only if the corresponding theta function provided a solution to the Kadomtsev–Petviashvili equation of soliton theory. This was proved by Takahiro Shiota (1986), following earlier work by Enrico Arbarello and Corrado de Concini (1984), and by Motohico Mulase (1984).

Later career
Since 1971 Novikov has worked at the Landau Institute for Theoretical Physics of the USSR Academy of Sciences. In 1981 he was elected  a Full Member of the USSR Academy of Sciences (Russian Academy of Sciences since 1991).
In 1982 Novikov was also appointed the Head of the Chair in Higher Geometry and Topology at the Moscow State University.

In 1984 he was elected as a member of Serbian Academy of Sciences and Arts.

, Novikov is the Head of the Department of geometry and topology at the Steklov Mathematical Institute.  He is also a Distinguished University Professor for the Institute for Physical Science and Technology, which is part of the University of Maryland College of Computer, Mathematical, and Natural Sciences at University of Maryland, College Park and is a Principal Researcher of the Landau Institute for Theoretical Physics in Moscow.

In 2005 Novikov was awarded the Wolf Prize for his contributions to algebraic topology, differential topology and to mathematical physics. He is one of just eleven mathematicians who received both the Fields Medal and the Wolf Prize. In 2020 he received the Lomonosov Gold Medal of the Russian Academy of Sciences.

Writings

 with Dubrovin and Fomenko: Modern geometry- methods and applications, Vol.1-3, Springer, Graduate Texts in Mathematics (originally 1984, 1988, 1990, V.1 The geometry of surfaces and transformation groups, V.2 The geometry and topology of manifolds, V.3 Introduction to homology theory)
 Topics in Topology and mathematical physics, AMS (American Mathematical Society) 1995
 Integrable systems - selected papers, Cambridge University Press 1981 (London Math. Society Lecture notes)

 with V. I. Arnold as editor and co-author: Dynamical systems, 1994, Encyclopedia of mathematical sciences, Springer
 Topology I: general survey, V. 12 of Topology Series of Encyclopedia of mathematical sciences, Springer 1996; 2013 edition
 Solitons and geometry, Cambridge 1994
 as editor, with Buchstaber: Solitons, geometry and topology: on the crossroads, AMS, 1997
 with Dubrovin and Krichever: Topological and Algebraic Geometry Methods in contemporary mathematical physics V.2, Cambridge 
 My generation in mathematics, Russian Mathematical Surveys V.49, 1994, p. 1

See also
Novikov–Shubin invariant
Novikov ring
Novikov inequalities

References

External links
Homepage and Curriculum Vitae on the website of Steklov Mathematical Institute
Biography (in Russian) on the website of Moscow State University

1938 births
Living people
Fields Medalists
20th-century Russian mathematicians
21st-century Russian mathematicians
Foreign associates of the National Academy of Sciences
Full Members of the USSR Academy of Sciences
Full Members of the Russian Academy of Sciences
Members of the Serbian Academy of Sciences and Arts
Foreign members of the Serbian Academy of Sciences and Arts
Moscow State University alumni
Academic staff of Moscow State University
Academic staff of the Independent University of Moscow
Soviet mathematicians
Topologists
University of Maryland, College Park faculty
Wolf Prize in Mathematics laureates
Lenin Prize winners
Mathematical physicists